Ansu may refer to:

 Ansu apricot, a common name for Prunus armeniaca
 Ansu, Hebei, a town in Xushui District, Hebei, China
 Ansoo Lake, a mountain lake in the Khyber-Pakhtunkhwa province of Pakistan
 Wanshū, a pattern of movements in karate
 *ansu-, the reconstructed root for the Germanic word Æsir
 Aansoo, a 2000 Pakistani TV drama 
 Ansu Fati (born 2002), Spanish footballer
 Ansu Toure (born 1991), Liberian footballer
 Ansu Sesay (born 1976), American basketball player

See also 
 Ansus language, an Austronesian language of Indonesian New Guinea
 Ansuz (rune), a Germanic rune
 AMSU, the Advanced Microwave Sounding Unit